Videonystagmography (VNG) is a technology for testing inner ear and central motor functions, a process known as vestibular assessment. It involves the use of infrared goggles to trace eye movements during visual stimulation and positional changes. VNG can determine whether dizziness is caused by inner ear disease, particularly benign paroxysmal positional vertigo (BPPV), as opposed to some other cause such as low blood pressure or anxiety.

VNG testing is made up of several components. Patients are asked to wear goggles with sensitive video cameras in them to monitor eye movement. During the first portion of the testing, patients will be required to follow a dot on a screen with their eyes. The dot may go up, down, side to side, or jump around randomly. 

Another portion of the test requires the patient to sit in several different positions, such as lying flat staring up, head to the right, head to the left, body rolled to the right, and body rolled to the left. 

The final part of the VNG requires caloric response testing.

References

Ear procedures